An annular solar eclipse will occur on June 21, 2039. A solar eclipse occurs when the Moon passes between Earth and the Sun, thereby totally or partly obscuring the image of the Sun for a viewer on Earth. An annular solar eclipse occurs when the Moon's apparent diameter is smaller than the Sun's, blocking most of the Sun's light and causing the Sun to look like an annulus (ring). An annular eclipse appears as a partial eclipse over a region of the Earth thousands of kilometres wide.
This eclipse will start only a few hours after the northern solstice and most of the path will go across areas with midnight sun.  For mainland Norway, Sweden and Belarus it will be the first central solar eclipse since June 1954.

Images 
Animated path

Related eclipses

Solar eclipses of 2036–2039

Saros 147

Metonic series

References

External links 
 NASA graphics

2039 6 21
2039 in science
2039 6 21
2039 6 21